John Wells (5 January 1760, in Wrecclesham, Surrey – 15 February 1835, in Wrecclesham) was a famous English cricketer who played for Surrey.

Career
Wells was a top-class all-rounder who batted right-handed.  He was a fast underarm bowler but it is not known if he bowled right or left-handed.  He was a fine fielder who was good enough to keep wicket on occasion.

Wells made his first-class debut in the 1787 English cricket season when he played for All-England versus White Conduit Club in one of the earliest matches at the new Lord's Cricket Ground, which had just opened that season.  He played until 1815.

Wells played for the Players in the second Gentlemen v Players match in 1806.

Family
His brother James Wells, an occasional player, also represented Surrey.  John married Hannah Beldham, sister of the legendary William Beldham.

References

External sources
 CricketArchive

Further reading
 G B Buckley, Fresh Light on 18th Century Cricket, Cotterell, 1935
 Arthur Haygarth, Scores & Biographies, Volume 1 (1744-1826), Lillywhite, 1862
 H T Waghorn, The Dawn of Cricket, Electric Press, 1906

1760 births
1835 deaths
English cricketers
English cricketers of 1787 to 1825
Surrey cricketers
Players cricketers
Hambledon cricketers
Hampshire cricketers
Marylebone Cricket Club cricketers
Kent cricketers
Middlesex cricketers
Left-Handed v Right-Handed cricketers
The Bs cricketers
Surrey and Marylebone Cricket Club cricketers
Brighton cricketers
R. Leigh's XI cricketers
Non-international England cricketers
West Kent cricketers
St John's Wood cricketers
George Osbaldeston's XI cricketers
T. Mellish's XI cricketers